Vilaverd is a municipality in the comarca of the Conca de Barberà in Catalonia, Spain.

The Prades Mountains are located in the vicinity of this municipality.

References

 Panareda Clopés, Josep Maria; Rios Calvet, Jaume; Rabella Vives, Josep Maria (1989). Guia de Catalunya, Barcelona: Caixa de Catalunya.  (Spanish).  (Catalan).

External links 
 Official website 
 Government data pages 

Municipalities in Conca de Barberà